Space burial is the launching of human remains into space. Missions may go into orbit around the Earth or to extraterrestrial bodies such as the Moon, or farther into space.

Remains are sealed until the spacecraft burns up upon re-entry into the Earth's atmosphere or they reach their extraterrestrial destinations. Suborbital flights briefly transport them into space then return to Earth where they can be recovered. Small samples of remains are usually launched to minimize the cost of launching mass into space, thereby making such services more affordable.

History and typology
The concept of launching human remains into space using conventional rockets was proposed by the science fiction author Neil R. Jones in the novella "The Jameson Satellite", which was published in the pulp magazine Amazing Stories in 1931. It was later proposed as a commercial service in the 1965 movie, The Loved One, and by Richard DeGroot in a The Seattle Times newspaper article on April 3, 1977. Since 1997, the private company Celestis has conducted numerous space burials flying as secondary payloads.

Maiden flights 

The first space burial occurred in 1992 when the NASA  (mission STS-52) carried a sample of Gene Roddenberry's cremated remains into space and returned them to Earth.

The first private space burial, Celestis' Earthview 01: The Founders Flight, was launched on April 21, 1997. Famous people on this flight included Roddenberry and Timothy Leary.

Suborbital flights 

Short flights that cross the boundary of space without attempting to reach orbital velocity are a cost-effective method of space burial. The remains do not burn up and are either recovered or lost.

Moon burial 

The first moon burial was that of Eugene Merle Shoemaker, a portion of whose cremated remains were flown to the Moon by NASA. Shoemaker's former colleague Carolyn Porco, a University of Arizona professor, proposed and produced the tribute of having Shoemaker's ashes launched aboard the NASA's Lunar Prospector spacecraft. Ten days after Shoemaker's passing, Porco had the go-ahead from NASA administrators and delivered the ashes to the Lunar Prospector Mission Director Scott Hubbard at the NASA Ames Research Center. The ashes were accompanied by a piece of brass foil inscribed with an image of Comet Hale–Bopp, an image of a Meteor Crater in northern Arizona, and a passage from William Shakespeare's Romeo and Juliet.  The Lunar Prospector spacecraft was launched on January 6, 1998, and impacted the south polar region of the Moon on July 31, 1999.

Missions to the Moon are proposed by both Elysium Space and Celestis as part of a mission by Astrobotic Technology of Pittsburgh.

Pet burial 

In 2014, Celestis launched Celestis Pets, a pet memorial spaceflight service for animal cremated remains. Prior to then, Bismarck, a Monroe, Washington police dog may have flown on a 2012 memorial spaceflight. When this news broke, Celestis' president said that if dog ashes were on the rocket, the person who supplied the cremated remains likely violated the contract they signed with Celestis.

Dedicated spacecraft 

On May 17, 2017, Elysium Space announced the world's first memorial flight involving a dedicated spacecraft. The CubeSat was placed as a secondary payload on a SpaceX Falcon 9 rocket as part of a dedicated rideshare mission called SSO-A planned by Spaceflight. The launch took place from Vandenberg Air Force Base in California on December 3rd, 2018. The launch was successful, however, industry sources have noted that the Elysium Star spacecraft remained attached to the deployer due to a failure to procure proper licensing.

Space burial businesses 
Space burial businesses generally refer to their service offering as "Memorial Spaceflight".

Spaceflight history

Orbital

Moon

Deep space

Suborbital

Notable individuals buried in space

Launched into Earth orbit
Gene Roddenberry (1921–1991), creator of Star Trek.
Gerard K. O'Neill (1927–1992), space physicist.
Krafft Ehricke (1917–1984), rocket scientist.
Timothy Leary (1920–1996), American writer, psychologist, psychedelic drug advocate and Harvard University professor.

James Doohan (1920– 2005), actor best known for his portrayal of Scotty in the television and film series Star Trek. Celestis also launched him into space in 2007 and in 2008.
Leroy Gordon "Gordo" Cooper, Jr. (1927–2004), American astronaut. He was one of the original Mercury Seven pilots in the Project Mercury program, the first crewed space effort by the United States.

Buried on the Moon
Eugene Merle Shoemaker (1928–1997), astronomer and co-discoverer of Comet Shoemaker–Levy 9.

Launched into outer space
Clyde Tombaugh (1906–1997), American astronomer and discoverer of Pluto in 1930. A small sample of Tombaugh's ashes are aboard New Horizons, the first spacecraft to attempt to pass by and photograph Pluto. This is the first sample of human cremated remains which will escape the solar system.

Future space burials 

Leiji Matsumoto (born 1938), Japanese creator of numerous anime and manga series including Galaxy Express 999, Space Battleship Yamato and Space Pirate Captain Harlock, announced his intention to have a symbolic portion of his cremated remains to be launched into space on a future Elysium Space mission.

Majel Barrett (1932–2008), American actress who played Christine Chapel in the original Star Trek series; wife of Gene Roddenberry. A symbolic portion of both her cremated remains and Roddenberry's cremated remains will be launched into space on a future Celestis mission.
William R. Pogue (1930–2014), American astronaut.
Luise Clayborn Kaish (1925–2013), American sculptor and painter.
Nichelle Nichols (1932–2022), American actress known for her role as Nyota Uhura in Star Trek is confirmed to have her ashes launched to space with Vulcan Centaur rocket that is currently in development.

References

External links
Aura Flights website
Celestis website
Celestis Pets website
Elysium Space website
The Real Elysium – Send Your Loved One Into Space for $2k, PandoDaily, 2013
Have A Space Burial As Elysium Sends Your Ashes Into Orbit, TechCrunch, 2013
Ash Scattering: Non-Traditional Ways To Be Memorialized, Huffington Post, 2012
The Ultimate One-Way Ticket, Wired Magazine, 2006
Death Is a Long, Strange Trip, Wired Magazine, 2006

 
Death customs
Burial
Funeral transport
Science fiction themes
1992 introductions